Ghanshyam Mahar (born 5 December 1962) is an Indian politician and the member of All India Congress Committee (congress). he previously served as the Member of Rajasthan Vidhan Sabha from 2013 to 2019.

References 

Living people
1962 births
People from Jaipur
Rajasthan MLAs 2013–2018
Indian National Congress politicians from Rajasthan